Phakomatosis pigmentovascularis is a rare neurocutanous condition where there is coexistence of a capillary malformation (port-wine stain) with various melanocytic lesions, including dermal melanocytosis (Mongolian spots), nevus spilus, and nevus of Ota.

Types
Phakomatosis pigmentovascularis is subdivided into five types:
 Type 1 PWS + epidermal nevus
 Type 2 (most common): PWS + dermal melanocytosis +/- nevus anemicus
 Type 3: PWS + nevus spilus +/- nevus anemicus
 Type 4: PWS + nevus spilus + dermal melanocytosis +/- nevus anemicus
 Type 5: CMTC (Cutis marmorata telangiectatica congenita) + dermal melanocytosis

They all can contain capillary malformation. Type 2 is the most common and can be associated with granular cell tumor. Some further subdivide each type into categories A & B; with A representing oculocutaneous involvement and subtype B representing extra oculocutaneous involvement. Others have proposed fewer subtypes but currently this rare entity is mostly taught as having five subtypes currently.

Diagnosis

Treatment

See also 
 List of cutaneous conditions

References

External links 

Dermal and subcutaneous growths
Neurocutaneous conditions
Rare diseases